Stephen (Steve) McCain (born January 9, 1974) is a retired American gymnast who competed at the 2000 Olympics and the 2001 World Artistic Gymnastics Championships. McCain attended the University of California, Los Angeles.

Olympics
After finishing 12th at the 1996 Olympic Trials and failing to make the team, McCain moved to the United States Olympic Training Center in Colorado Springs, Colorado to focus more on his career.

Other international competition
McCain participated in four World Championships.  In 2001, his team won a silver medal.

McCain retired from gymnastics after not making the US Olympic Team in 2004.

References

American gymnasts
1974 births
Living people
Pan American Games medalists in gymnastics
Pan American Games gold medalists for the United States
Pan American Games silver medalists for the United States
Gymnasts at the 1995 Pan American Games
Gymnasts at the 1999 Pan American Games
Olympic gymnasts of the United States
Gymnasts at the 2000 Summer Olympics